David Dickson may refer to:

 David Dickson (minister) (1583?–1663), Scottish theologian
 David Dickson the Elder (1754–1820), Church of Scotland minister
 David Dickson (surgeon) (1780–1850), Scottish naval surgeon
 David Dickson the Younger (1780–1842), Scottish minister
 David C. Dickson (Mississippi politician) (1794–1836), American politician in the state of Mississippi
 David Catchings Dickson (1818–1880), American politician in the state of Texas
 David Dickson (swimmer) (born 1941), Australian swimmer
 David Dickson (footballer) (born 1952), Australian rules footballer at Carlton

See also
David Dickinson (born 1941), English antiques expert and television presenter
David Dickson Rogers (1845–1915), Canadian politician 
David Dixon (disambiguation)